Pete Sampras was the two-time defending champion, but lost in the final to Andre Agassi, 2–6, 4–6.

Seeds

Draw

Finals

Top half

Bottom half

References
Main draw

1998 ATP Tour
SAP Open